Sabuhah is a village in Makkah Province, in western Saudi Arabia.

References

Populated places in Mecca Province